Zatavua is a genus of Malagasy cellar spiders that was first described by B. A. Huber in 2003.

Species
 it contains seventeen species, found only on Madagascar:
Zatavua analalava Huber, 2003 – Madagascar
Zatavua andrei (Millot, 1946) – Madagascar
Zatavua ankaranae (Millot, 1946) – Madagascar
Zatavua fagei (Millot, 1946) – Madagascar
Zatavua griswoldi Huber, 2003 (type) – Madagascar
Zatavua imerinensis (Millot, 1946) – Madagascar
Zatavua impudica (Millot, 1946) – Madagascar
Zatavua isalo Huber, 2003 – Madagascar
Zatavua kely Huber, 2003 – Madagascar
Zatavua madagascariensis (Fage, 1945) – Madagascar
Zatavua mahafaly Huber, 2003 – Madagascar
Zatavua punctata (Millot, 1946) – Madagascar
Zatavua talatakely Huber, 2003 – Madagascar
Zatavua tamatave Huber, 2003 – Madagascar
Zatavua voahangyae Huber, 2003 – Madagascar
Zatavua vohiparara Huber, 2003 – Madagascar
Zatavua zanahary Huber, 2003 – Madagascar

See also
 List of Pholcidae species

References

Araneomorphae genera
Pholcidae
Spiders of Madagascar